Vinod Gupta (born 16 December 1946) is an Indian former cricketer. He played first-class cricket for Delhi, Orissa and Uttar Pradesh between 1966 and 1978.

See also
 List of Delhi cricketers

References

External links
 

1946 births
Living people
Indian cricketers
Delhi cricketers
Odisha cricketers
Uttar Pradesh cricketers
Sportspeople from Meerut
Cricketers from Uttar Pradesh